Isobel Dinah Lang (born 16 July 1970 in Lincoln) is a weather presenter for Sky News.

Early life
Lang grew up in Sussex and Hertfordshire. She graduated with a BSc degree in mathematics in 1991 from the University of Exeter, before joining the Met Office in 1991 where she prepared forecasts for the press, and presented the weather on local radio.

Broadcasting
She joined the BBC on 31 May 1995, becoming one of the better known faces of BBC Weather, in part due to her distinctive red hair. She appeared across all of the BBC's TV and Radio news outlets, including regular primetime forecasts on BBC One and appearances on BBC World and BBC News 24.

Isobel left the BBC Weather Centre in August 2006 and joined Sky News in September 2006 where she also presented forecasts for Channel 5 until February 2012.

Personal life
She married Christopher Clarke in September 1997 in Hatfield, Hertfordshire. She had a son in September 2002 and a daughter in January 2004. They live in south west London.

References

External links

Video clips
 Mystery head
 11 August 1996 BBC forecast by Isobel Lang

1970 births
Living people
People from Lincoln, England
People from Hertfordshire
Alumni of the University of Exeter
English meteorologists
BBC weather forecasters
Sky News weather forecasters